Russian Rhapsody may refer to:
 Russian Rhapsody (film), 1944 cartoon directed by Robert Clampett
 Russian Rhapsody (Rachmaninoff), a composition by Sergei Rachmaninoff for two pianos